Pat Conway (born October 8, 1947) is an American politician. He was a member of the Missouri House of Representatives from the 10th District from 2010 to 2019. He is a member of the Democratic Party.

References

1947 births
21st-century American politicians
Living people
Democratic Party members of the Missouri House of Representatives